Dobovec ( or) is a settlement in the Municipality of Trbovlje in central Slovenia. It lies in the hills above the right bank of the Sava River. The area is part of the traditional region of Lower Carniola. It is now included with the rest of the municipality in the Central Sava Statistical Region.

Name
The name Dobovec is derived from the adjective dobov, based on the common noun *dǫbъ 'deciduous tree, oak'. Like similar names (e.g., Dobova, Dobovica), it originally referred to the local vegetation. In the past the German name was Dobouz.

History
Early settlement of the area is attested by the remnants of a prehistoric mound grave and dwellings. During the Second World War, many farmers were evicted from the Dobovec by German forces.

Mass graves
Dobovec is the site of two known mass graves associated with the Second World War. They both contain the remains of unidentified victims. The Dobovec Mass Grave is located on an embankment between the Sava River and the main road. The Ustaša Ravine Mass Grave lies in the woods next to a creek opposite the landmark Trbovlje Chimney.

Church

The parish church in the village is dedicated to Saint Anne and belongs to the Roman Catholic Archdiocese of Ljubljana. It is a Late Baroque building dating to the second half of the 18th century with 19th-century adaptations. The church was elevated to a parish in 1776. The main altar dates from 1846. The right altar painting of Saint Joseph is an 1847 work by Josip Egartner, and the left altar painting of the Annunciation is also believed to be his work.

References

External links
Dobovec on Geopedia

Populated places in the Municipality of Trbovlje